Tholera is a genus of moths of the family Noctuidae.

Species
Tholera americana Smith, 1894
Tholera cespitis Denis & Schiffermüller, 1775
Tholera decimalis – Feathered Gothic Poda, 1761
Tholera gracilis Kostrowicki, 1963
Tholera hilaris Staudinger, 1901

References
Natural History Museum Lepidoptera genus database
Tholera at funet

Hadenini